Lars Erik ("Lasse") Dahlquist (14 September 1910 in Örgryte (grew also up in Lidingö) – died 14 October 1979 on Brännö, Gothenburg archipelago due to laryngeal cancer) was a Swedish composer, singer and actor. Many of his songs are among the most popular sing-along songs in Sweden, such as Oh boy oh boy oh boy and Gå upp och pröva dina vingar.

He was married to Inez Margareta Dahlquist, née Lindquist (1911–2004) from 1936 and they had a son; the saxophonist Robert "Bob" Dahlquist (2 September 1938 – 6 September 2005). On Saltholmen, at the terminal of the boats of Styrsöbolaget, there is a place called Lasse Dahlquists Plats.

When he was a child, during the summers he was at his grandfather's farm Langegården on Brännö where he built his own home.
 
He worked at Sven-Olof Sandberg's music publishment Svenska Noter and 1931 he began recording gramophone records.

In 1977 he received the Evert Taube award.

Selected filmography
Pojkarna på Storholmen (1932)
 Jolly Musicians (1932)
Skärgårdsflirt (1935)
 Just a Bugler (1938)
Styrman Karlssons flammor (1938)
Sjöcharmörer (1939)
 The Crazy Family (1940)
 Goransson's Boy (1941)
 It Is My Music (1942)
 Eaglets (1944)
Sista natten (1956)

Film music (selected)
Örnungar (1944)
Västkustens hjältar (1940)
Vi på Solgläntan (1939)
Sjöcharmörer (1939)
Vi trumpetare (1938)

Famous songs written by Lasse Dahlquist
De' ä' dans på Brännö brygga
Oh boy oh boy oh boy
Kom lella vän ska vi segla
Gå upp och pröva dina vingar
Hallå du gamle indian
Morfar har berättat
Stuvarevalsen
Här dansar kustens glada kavaljer
Charlie Truck Polka
Jolly Bob från Aberdeen

References

1979 deaths
1910 births
Swedish male composers
20th-century Swedish male singers
Musicians from Gothenburg
Deaths from laryngeal cancer
20th-century Swedish male actors
20th-century classical musicians
20th-century composers